The 1953  Arizona State Sun Devils football team represented Arizona State University in the sport of football during the 1953 college football season. The team was led by head coach Clyde B. Smith.  Home games were played at Goodwin Stadium in Tempe, Arizona. Arizona State finished the 1953 football campaign 4–5–1 overall and 1–3 in Border Conference play.

Schedule

References

Arizona State
Arizona State Sun Devils football seasons
Arizona State Sun Devils football